, there were about 25,000 electric vehicles (not including plug-in hybrid vehicles) registered in North Carolina.

Government policy
, the state government does not offer any tax rebates for electric vehicle purchases.

Manufacturing
North Carolina is widely considered to be a potential manufacturing hub for both electric vehicles and charging stations.

By region

Charlotte
, there were 88 electric vehicles in the Charlotte city fleet.

Winston-Salem
, there were more than 120 public charging stations in Winston-Salem.

References

North Carolina
Road transportation in North Carolina